The 2016 Calgary Stampeders season was the 59th season for the team in the Canadian Football League and their 82nd overall. The Stampeders finished in 1st place in the West Division and finished with a 15–2–1 record. The Stampeders qualified for the playoffs for the 12th straight year and advanced to the Grey Cup game where they lost to the Ottawa Redblacks. This season was Dave Dickenson's first year as head coach after John Hufnagel moved into a strict general manager role.

In the early morning hours of September 25, 2016, Stampeders defensive back Mylan Hicks was shot and killed at a Calgary nightclub. Fellow defensive back and teammate Jamar Wall changed his jersey number from 29 to no. 31 for the rest of the season in honour of Hicks. Each game played in week 15 across the league had a moment of silence in honour of Mylan Hicks. As a gesture to his memorial, the pistols that adorned the shoulders of the black alternate jersey were covered up.

With their week 16 win over the Toronto Argonauts, the Stampeders clinched first place in the West Division, a first-round bye in the 2016 playoffs, and hosted the 2016 West Final game. A win in that game over the BC Lions gave them a berth into the 104th Grey Cup. The Stampeders lost the Grey Cup game 39–33 to the Ottawa Redblacks in overtime.

Preseason

Regular season

Standings

Schedule

Post season

Schedule

Team

Roster

Coaching staff

References

Calgary Stampeders seasons
2016 Canadian Football League season by team
Calgary Stampeders